Harris Manchester College (HMC) is one of the constituent colleges of the University of Oxford in the United Kingdom. It was founded in Warrington in 1757 as a college for Unitarian students and moved to Oxford in 1893. It became a full college of the university in 1996, taking its current name to commemorate its predecessor the Manchester Academy and a benefaction by Lord Harris of Peckham.

The college's postgraduate and undergraduate places are exclusively for students aged 21 years or over. With around 100 undergraduates and 150 postgraduates, Harris Manchester is the smallest undergraduate college in either of the Oxbridge universities.

History

Foundation and relocation 

The college started as the Warrington Academy in 1757 where its teachers included Joseph Priestley, before being refounded as the Manchester Academy in Manchester in 1786. Originally run by English Presbyterians, it was one of several dissenting academies that provided religious nonconformists with higher education, as at the time the only universities in England – Oxford and Cambridge – were restricted to Anglicans. It taught radical theology as well as modern subjects, such as science, modern languages, language, and history; as well as the classics. Its most famous professor was John Dalton, developer of atomic theory.

The college changed its location five times before settling in Oxford. It was located in Manchester between 1786 and 1803. It moved to York until 1840. It was located at 38 Monkgate, just outside Monkbar; later this was the first building of the College of Ripon and York St John (now York St John University). The key person in York was Charles Wellbeloved, a Unitarian minister, after whom a function room in the college is named. Because he would not move to Manchester, the college moved to York to have him as head. At first he taught all subjects, but hired additional tutors after a year. He always worked hard and several times his health broke. Wellbeloved did not allow the school to be called Unitarian because he wanted students to have an open mind and to discover the truth for themselves. In 1809 he wrote to George Wood,

Under Wellbeloved's principalship 235 students were educated at the college: 121 divinity students and 114 laymen. Of the former, 30 did not enter the ministry and five entered the Anglican priesthood. Among the lay students were scholars, public servants, businessmen, and notable men in the arts. The majority was Unitarian.

In 1840, when age forced him to retire, the college moved back to Manchester, where it stayed until 1853. In 1840, the college started an association with the University of London, and gained the right to present students for degrees from London. Between 1853 and 1889 the college was located in London, in University Hall, Gordon Square. From London it moved to Oxford, opening its new buildings in 1893.  In Oxford, the Unitarian Manchester College was viewed with alarm by orthodox Anglicans. William Sanday was warned that his presence at the official opening of 'an institution which professedly allows such fundamental Christian truths as the Holy Trinity and the Incarnation to be treated as open questions' would 'tend to the severance of the friendly relation subsisting between the University and the Church'.

Social reform 

In its early days, the college supported reforming causes, such as the abolition of slavery (1778), and the repeal of the Test Act (1828) and the Corporation Act (1828). In 1922 the principal, L.P. Jacks, hosted Rudolf Steiner to present a conference on alternative education and the model Waldorf school at Stuttgart, Germany which led to the establishment of such schools in Britain.
In the 1920s and 1930s, the college provided courses for the Workers' Educational Association.

Women were permitted to attend some lectures in college from 1876, and in 1877, the college set up a series of examinations in theology, which could be taken by women as well as men. In 1901, Gertrude von Petzold graduated from her training at Manchester College to become a minister in the Unitarian church- the first woman to be qualified as a minister in England. This was possible despite the fact that Oxford University did not formally accept female students or award them degrees until 1920 because Manchester College was at that time associated with the University of London, which in 1878 became the first UK university to award degrees to women.

World War II 
Manchester College played a significant part in the planning of the D-Day landings on 6 June 1944. The Ministry of Works and Buildings  requisitioned most of the college's buildings on 17 October 1941 to facilitate the Naval Intelligence and the Inter-Services Topographic Department (ISTD). ISTD operations focussed on gathering of topographical intelligence for the day when the Allies would return to continental Europe.

Departments were divided between  Oxford and Cambridge, but it was the ISTD section in Manchester College which planned Operation Overlord, known as the D-Day landings. The college's Arlosh Hall served as the main centre of operations, with Nissen huts and tents put up in the quads. Among various other sources, the nearby School of Geography of the university supplied the ISTD with many maps and charts which proved an essential part in the success of the invasion.

Modern day 

Manchester College became a permanent private hall of Oxford University in 1990 and subsequently a full constituent college, being granted a royal charter in 1996. At the same time, it changed its name to Harris Manchester College in recognition of a benefaction by Philip Harris, Baron Harris of Peckham. Formerly known as Manchester College, it is listed in the University Statutes (V.1) as Manchester Academy and Harris College, and at university ceremonies it is called Collegium de Harris et Manchester.

Today the college only accepts students over the age of 21, both for undergraduate and graduate studies. The college tries to continue its liberal and pioneering ethos, considering its mature student focus as a modern means of providing higher education to those that have been excluded from it in the past.

The college houses several research centres, including the Commercial Law Centre, directed by Prof Kristin van Zwieten, Clifford Chance Associate Professor of Law and Finance, which engages in research in all aspects of national, international, transnational and comparative law relating to commerce and finance; and the Wellbeing Research Centre, directed by Prof Jan-Emmanuel De Neve, which applies interdisciplinary research and teaching on well-being at Oxford.

Buildings 
The main quad was designed by architect Thomas Worthington, and built between 1889 and 1893. It houses the Tate Library and the chapel. The Arlosh hall, designed by Percy Worthington, was added in 1913. The college also has several newer buildings to the West of the main quad. In 2013–2014 the Siew-Sngiem Clock Tower & Sukum Navapan Gate were added to the Arlosh quad. The inscription on the tower "It is later than you think, but it is never too late", refers to the role of the college in educating mature students.

In 2018 a new building named Maevadi Hall was completed after two years of construction. It is situated to the west of the Arlosh Hall and contains a conference room, student accommodation and a student social area.

Chapel 

The chapel designed by "Worthington and Elgood" was inaugurated in 1893. The chapel is notable for its stained-glass windows by the Pre-Raphaelite artists Sir Edward Burne-Jones and William Morris, as well as its ornate wood carvings and organ, which was painted by Morris and Co. Seating in the chapel consisted of individual chairs until pews were added in 1897. The oak screen was added in 1896 and the original windows were made of plain glass until the installation of stained glass windows in 1895 and 1899.

Particularly noteworthy are the stained glass windows on the north wall of the chapel, which were installed in 1896 and depict the Six Days of Creation. These were donated by James and Isabella Arlosh in memory of their son Godfrey. The Unitarian-affiliated Manchester College Oxford Chapel Society meets in the college chapel on Sundays. The society is affiliated to the General Assembly of Unitarian and Free Christian Churches.

The Tate Library 

Despite being one of the smallest colleges of Oxford University, Harris Manchester boasts the sixth largest college library and offers the best student population to book ratio.  It houses a collection of books and manuscripts dating back to the fifteenth century and is famous for its antiquarian books, tract collection, and library of Protestant Dissent. The Tate Library was built by Sir Henry Tate, the benefactor behind London's Tate Gallery. The library was expanded in 2011 with the addition of a gallery, designed to blend in with the Victorian Gothic architecture. The library is well stocked in all the major subjects offered by the college including English Literature, Philosophy, Theology, Politics, Economics, Law, History and Medicine. It also holds a significant collection on the history of Protestant dissent in England and is home to the Carpenter Library of World Religions, donated to the college by its former principal, J. Estlin Carpenter.

Harris Manchester College is located 200 metres from the Bodleian Library, the main research library of Oxford University, as well as the English, History, Social Sciences, and Law faculty libraries.

Student life 
Despite the small student body, the college offers a wide array of courses. Many undergraduate tutorials are carried out in the college, though for some specialist papers undergraduates may be sent to tutors in other colleges. Members are generally expected to dine in the Arlosh Hall, where there is a twice-weekly formal dinner on Mondays and Wednesdays at which students dress in jackets, ties, and gowns.

Sports 
Although the college does not have its own sports ground, it consistently enters women's and men's teams into the university leagues, and members routinely join teams from other colleges. The college has a punt, The Royle Yacht, and a croquet lawn.

In recent years the college's ice hockey team has been successful, once winning second place in the intercollegiate cuppers tournament, with the Basketball team winning third place in its intercollegiate cuppers tournament the year before. There is also an active pool team and a thriving squash club.

Harris Manchester also has an affiliation with neighbouring Wadham College for those interested in becoming members of Wadham College Boat Club, which came in second in the 2012 Women's Torpids and Summer VIIIs, and saw both the First and Second Men's boats winning blades.

Junior Common Room (JCR) Bar 
Harris Manchester has one of the three remaining student run college bars in Oxford (the others being Balliol College and St Cross College). The common room is decorated with William Morris wallpaper.

Gallery

Notable people

Principals 

Since 2018 the principal of the college has been the historian, Professor Jane Shaw.

People associated with Harris Manchester

Fellows of the College

Alumni

See also 
 List of dissenting academies (19th century)
Warrington Academy
College of the University of Oxford

References

Further reading 
 A Fine Victorian Gentleman: The Life and Times of Charles Wellbeloved by Frank Schulman, published by Harris Manchester College 1999.  Pages 55–89 cover Wellbeloved's period as principal of Manchester College, York.

External links 

 
 Virtual tour

 
1786 establishments in England
Colleges of the University of Oxford
Educational institutions established in 1786
Buildings and structures of the University of Oxford